Khaleq Verdi (also Romanized as Khāleq Verdī; also known as Kal Kurdi and Khalegh Verdi) is a village in Mehraban-e Sofla Rural District, Gol Tappeh District, Kabudarahang County, Hamadan Province, Iran. At the 2006 census, its population was 421, in 91 families.

References 

Populated places in Kabudarahang County